Onni Happonen (21 May 1898 – 1 September 1930) was a Finnish politician representing the Social Democratic Party of Finland. He was kidnapped and murdered by the fascist Lapua Movement.

Happonen was born in Pölläkkä, Heinävesi, Southern Savonia. He was a construction entrepreneur and the chairman of the Heinävesi municipal council. As a politician, Happonen often argued with local landowners who were supporters or members of the Lapua Movement and the paramilitary right-wing White Guard.

Together with the Ståhlberg kidnapping, the Peasant March and the Mäntsälä rebellion, the Happonen murder is one of the major incidents involving the Lapua Movement.

Death 

Happonen had already been kidnapped and beaten in July 1930. Instead of the police, Happonen contacted the Governor Albin Pulkkinen who ordered his protection. However, on 1 September 1930, a fascist mob rushed the council meeting at the Heinävesi town hall. Happonen fled to the back room where he tried to call a trusted policeman but the lines were cut off. Happonen then escaped through the window firing a warning shot, but as the pistol malfunctioned he was caught by the Lapua activists.

The local police officer, who belonged to the staff of the Heinävesi White Guard, now arrested Happonen for the shooting, but instead of taken into custody, he was handed over to the mob. Happonen was forced to a car which drove towards Joensuu. The vehicle stopped near the Karvio Canal where Happonen was taken out and killed.

Happonen's body was missing until July 1932 when it was found buried in anthill on side of the Varkaus–Joensuu-highway, 45 kilometers from Heinävesi. According to the autopsy report, Happonen was severely beaten and killed by a neck shot.

Murder trial 
Once Happonen's body was found, two local working men, Otto Pakarinen and Anselmi Puustinen, confessed to having carried out the murder. In November 1933, they were sentenced to nine years and six years, respectively, in prison. Seven Lapua Movement members from Kuopio were given sentences of between three and six months for having been involved in the kidnapping, but the local activists were not convicted.

After hearing their sentences, Pakarinen and Puustinen announced that their testimony had been false, and that they had been given bribes on condition that they would plead guilty to the killing. They now insisted that they themselves had done no more than help to conceal Happonen's body, and that they did not know who the actual murderers were. Finally, the Supreme Court dropped the charges against Puustinen; on the other hand, the court upheld the conviction of Pakarinen. To this day, the real assassins of Happonen remain unknown.

See also
List of kidnappings
List of solved missing person cases
List of unsolved murders

References

External links

1898 births
1930 deaths
1930s missing person cases
Deaths by firearm in Finland
Finnish murder victims
Formerly missing people
Kidnapped people
Male murder victims
Missing person cases in Finland
People from Heinävesi
Social Democratic Party of Finland politicians
Unsolved murders in Finland